The Annie Award for Character Animation in a Live Action Production is an Annie Award given annually to the best character animation for live action productions, including feature films and television series. It was first presented at the 38th Annie Awards.

Prior to the creation of this category, live-action productions were included in the Outstanding Achievement for Character Animation in a Feature Production category.

Winners and nominees

2010s

2020s

See also
 Visual Effects Society Award for Outstanding Animated Character in a Photoreal Feature

References

External links 
 Annie Awards: Legacy

Annie Awards